Silloth-on-Solway is a civil parish in the Borough of Allerdale in Cumbria, England.  It contains ten listed buildings that are recorded in the National Heritage List for England.  All the listed buildings are designated at Grade II, the lowest of the three grades, which is applied to "buildings of national importance and special interest".  The parish contains the town of Silloth and the village of Skinburness.  Skinburness was founded as a market town by Holmcultram Abbey in the 13th century, but much of it was lost to erosion by the sea in 1301.  Silloth was created as a port by the Carlisle and Silloth Bay Railway in the 1850s, and the town was laid out on a grid plan.  The listed buildings consist of houses, hotels, shops, a convalescent home, a bank, a war memorial, and a church.


Buildings

References

Citations

Sources

Lists of listed buildings in Cumbria
Listed buildings